= Nevis Television =

Ntv8
- Country: Saint Kitts and Nevis
- Headquarters: Nevis

History
- Launched: January 12, 2001; 25 years ago

Nevis Television is a TV channel of Nevis.

== History ==
The Department of Information developed out of the Nevis Island Administration’s Press and Public Affairs arm in 2001. The Department of Information is responsible for keeping the general public aware of the plans and activities of the Nevis Island Administration. At launch, the Department's primary responsibility was documenting major events and public programs, which were shared through local print media and radio. The “Nevis Television” media brand was quickly developed and began broadcasting on local terrestrial television in 2001. In its early days, the channel's main programming consisted of a weekly news roundup, called “The Week Gone By”. This later evolved into the Nevis News Cast (NNC), which began airing on Nevis Television three (3) times weekly. Other NTV programming in the station’s early years included rebroadcasts of the House of Assembly sittings, addresses by Ministers of Government and community interest features.

By 2003, The Nevis News Cast had expanded to a nightly broadcast. The station also introduced new programming, including “Eye on Agriculture”, “Up Close”, and “Get Real”. Nevis Television regularly covered events for the NIA, local schools, and the annual Culturama festival, broadcasting daily between 18:00 and 22:00.

As an increasing number of Departments within the Nevis Island Administration began to see the NTV platform as a viable option to reach their intended audiences, this pushed the development of different shows which sought to inform, educate and entertain a captive and growing audience. As production capacity increased and technologies bloomed, NTV branched into an online service, making the station available internationally, and keeping Nevisians abroad well connected to developments at home. Full streaming of the channel became available in 2015. In 2017 NTV embarked into a full 24 hour programming lineup.

The Department of Information continues to meet the challenge of providing accurate, up to date and newsworthy information to the public, while also seeking to enhance and promote the cultural fabric of the island.

== Logos ==
Past and current logos
logo	description
	2015–present. The current logo of Nevis Television is its second version. It is used for online media and broadcast.
